Miss Terra Italia, or Miss Earth Italia, is an Italian beauty pageant in Italy that selects the Italian representative for the Miss Earth pageant. The pageant was first organized in 2006 and it is not related to Miss Italy or Miss Universo Italia, although some delegates have crossed over from one format to the other throughout the years.

History
Miss Earth Italia was found in 2006, basically Italy started to compete in 2001. In 2002-2005 no pageant to select Italian beauties for the Miss Earth pageant.

Purpose
Miss Earth Italia candidate from each country is chosen by a jury of experts and crowned on the basis of a demonstrated sensitivity to environmental and humanitarian problems. With the national title, Miss Earth attends the world final of Miss Earth in Manila, where the winner among the 90 countries in competition automatically becomes the spokesperson for the Miss Earth Foundation, the United Nations Environment Programme (UNEP) and other groups environmental engaged on a global scale.

Titleholders
Color key

The winner of Miss Terra Italia represents her country at Miss Earth. On occasion, when the winner does not qualify (due to age) for either contest, a runner-up is sent.

Notes
2013: Luna Voce won the title of Miss Universo Italia 2013 and competed at the Miss Universe 2013 in Moscow, Russia.

External links
Official website

2006 establishments in Italy
Beauty pageants in Italy
Italy
Recurring events established in 2006
Italian awards